Winkelhaid is a municipality in the district of Nürnberger Land in Bavaria in Germany. It is situated 18 km southeast of Nuremberg in the Middle Franconia. Winkelhaid is bounded by (from the north and clockwise) the districts of Altdorf bei Nürnberg, Schwarzenbruck and Feucht.

Districts 
 Penzenhofen
 Richthausen
 Ungelstetten
 Winkelhaid

Climate 
Winkelhaid has an oceanic climate (Koppen: Cfb), influenced by its inland position and higher altitude causing seasonal differences reminiscent of continental climates, although its winters are somewhat milder.  The average annual temperature is 8.2 °C with an average yearly precipitation of 693 millimeters. The average temperature in January is −1.3 °C and in July 17.5 °C. The driest month is February with precipitation of around 41 mm. The wettest month is June, with 81 mm per month.

References

Nürnberger Land